Lewis and Sophie Griebel House is a historic home located at Warrensburg, Johnson County, Missouri. It was built about 1885, and is a one-story, cruciform-shaped, Folk Victorian frame dwelling. It has a steeply-pitched cross-gabled roof and ornate porches with flat roofs fill the spaces between the wings.  The house features two types of imbricated shingles, lacy vergeboards with spindles, turned porch supports, serrated brackets, and a three-sided oriel window with elaborated panels.  Also on the property are the contributing garage and chicken house.

It was listed on the National Register of Historic Places in 2012.

References

Houses on the National Register of Historic Places in Missouri
Victorian architecture in Missouri
Houses completed in 1885
Buildings and structures in Johnson County, Missouri
National Register of Historic Places in Johnson County, Missouri